The Holy Cross Armenian Apostolic Cathedral in Montebello, California,  is the cathedral of the Western Prelacy of the Armenian Apostolic Church of America.

Montebello is home to the oldest Armenian Community in Los Angeles County. There is also an Armenian Martyrs Monument at Bicknell Park.

The annual Armenian Food Fair is  hosted in May every year at Holy Cross Cathedral in Montebello.

References

Armenian-American culture in California
Cathedrals in California
Churches in California
Churches in Los Angeles County, California
San Gabriel Valley
Montebello, California
Armenian Apostolic churches in the United States
Armenian Apostolic cathedrals in the United States